Davoud Noushi Soufiani (born July 15, 1990) is an Iranian football goalkeeper who currently plays for Mes Rafsanjan in Persian Gulf Pro League.

Club career
Noshi joined Shahrdari Tabriz in 2010, after spending the previous season at Machine Sazi in the 2nd Division of Iranian Football.

International career
Noshi participated in the Iranian U-20 qualifying matches against Oman and India for the 2008 AFC U-19 Championship.

Noshi Also participated in the 2006 AFC Youth Championship.

Honours
Tractor Sazi
Hazfi Cup (1): 2013–14

References

Iranian footballers
Association football goalkeepers
Shahrdari Tabriz players
1990 births
Tractor S.C. players
Living people
Rah Ahan players
Sportspeople from Tabriz
Iran under-20 international footballers
Gostaresh Foulad F.C. players
Persian Gulf Pro League players
Mes Rafsanjan players
Sanat Naft Abadan F.C. players
Pars Jonoubi Jam players